The 143rd Street station was a station on the demolished IRT Third Avenue Line in the Bronx, New York City. It was originally opened on May 23, 1886, by the Suburban Rapid Transit Company, one week after replacing the recently opened 133rd Street station as the northern terminus of the Third Avenue Line.  This station had two tracks and one island platform, and was also served by trains of the IRT Second Avenue Line until June 11, 1940. This station closed on May 12, 1955, with the ending of all service on the Third Avenue El south of 149th Street.

References

External links
 
 

IRT Second Avenue Line stations
IRT Third Avenue Line stations
Railway stations in the United States opened in 1886
Railway stations closed in 1955
1886 establishments in New York (state)
1955 disestablishments in New York (state)
Former elevated and subway stations in the Bronx
Mott Haven, Bronx